Wachendorfia brachyandra is a small to large,  high, winter-growing, perennial herbaceous plant that grows from a rootstock, and has been assigned to the bloodroot family. The inflorescence is a lax panicle and at the base of each flowerstalk is a dry, brown and papery bract, and those higher in the panicle have a recurved tip. The mirror-symmetrical pale apricot-yellow flowers consist of six tepals and are adorned with brown markings on the upper three tepals. There are three anthers that are clustered and about half as long as the tepals. Each individual flower only lasts one day. Flowering occurs from August to December. This species grows in the wild in the Western Cape province of South Africa only, and is much less common than its relatives W. paniculata and W. thyrsiflora. It is sometimes called short-stamen butterfly-lily in English.

Description 
The plant dies-down during the dry, hot summer. The flowers are set in a lax, simple, seldom compound panicle with 6-17 flowers per peduncle. The upper tepal id smaller than the others and only slightly recurved. The margin of the tepals is only rarely adorned with a row of equally long hairs at regular intervals. Unique for this Wachendorfia species is that the three stamens are clustered, not spreading, and at  only about half as long as tepals.

Differences from related species 

Taxonomy 
The short-stamen butterfly-lily was first distinguished by South African botanist Winsome Fanny Barker in 1949. No synonyms are known. The genus Wachendorfia is named in honor of Evert Jacob van Wachendorff, professor of botany and chemistry and later rector at the University of Utrecht in the 18th century. The name of the species brachyandra is compounded from the Ancient Greek βραχύς (brachys), meaning "short" and ἀνδρός (andros), "male's", a reference to the relatively short stamens.

Phylogeny 
Comparison of homologous DNA has increased the insight in the phylogenetic relationships between the species of Wachendorfia. The following tree represents those insights.

Distribution, ecology and conservation 
The short-stamen butterfly-lily can be found on the west coast of the Western Cape province of South Africa between Saldanha in the north and the Cape Peninsula in the south, and inland as far as Franschhoek. It grows in seasonally moist sandstone or granite soils, at  altitude, in an area with predominant precipitation during the winter half year. It mostly occurs in the following vegetation types: Boland Granite Fynbos, Cape Flats Sand Fynbos, Peninsula Granite Fynbos, Saldanha Granite Strandveld, Swartland Alluvium Fynbos, Swartland Granite Renosterveld, and Swartland Silcrete Renosterveld. It is considered a vulnerable species.

References 

Haemodoraceae